Kraus is a German surname meaning "curly". Notable people with the surname include:

 Adalbert Kraus (born 1937), German tenor
 Adam Kraus (born 1984), American footballer
 Adolf Kraus (1850–1928), lawyer and Jewish leader
 Adolph Robert Kraus (1850–1901), American sculptor
 Alanna Kraus (born 1977), Canadian speed skater
 Albert Kraus (born 1980), Dutch welterweight kickboxer
 Alfredo Kraus (1927–1999), Spanish opera singer
 Barbara Kraus, Austrian physicist
 Bill Kraus (1947–1986), American homosexual rights and AIDS activist
 Brigitte Kraus (born 1956), German middle distance runner
 Bruce Kraus (born 1954), American politician and businessman
 Charles A. Kraus (1875–1967), American chemist
 Charles Kraus (clown) (born 1946), American clown, magician, writer, and comedian
 Chris Kraus (American writer) (born 1955), American writer and filmmaker
 Chris Kraus (director) (born 1963), German author and filmmaker
 Christian Jakob Kraus (1753–1807), German linguist
 Daniel Kraus (disambiguation)
 Derek Kraus (born 2001), American racing driver
 Detlef Kraus (1919–2008), German pianist
 Dick Kraus (1937–2019), American educator and politician
 Eileen Kraus (1938–2017), American banker
 Engelbert Kraus (1934–2016), German football player
 Ernst Kraus (1863–1941), German tenor
 Ezra Jacob Kraus (1885–1960), American botanist and horticulturist
 Felix von Kraus (1870–1937), Austrian singer
 Franz Kraus (1905–1998), Israeli graphic designer
 Franz Xaver Kraus (1840–1901), German Catholic priest
 Friedrich Kraus (1858–1936), Bohemian Austrian physician
 Georg Melchior Kraus (1737–1806), German painter
 Gertrud Kraus (1901–1977), Israeli modern dancer
 Gregor Kraus (1841–1915), German botanist
 Hans Kraus (1905–1995), Austrian-American physician and rock climber
 Hans-Georg Kraus (born 1949), German footballer
 Hans P. Kraus (1907–1988), German-American antiquarian book dealer
 Hans-Werner Kraus (1915–1990), German U-boat commander
 Hansi Kraus (born 1952), German actor
 Henry Kraus (1906–1995), American historian
 Herbert Kraus (1884–1965), German professor of international law
 Jacob Kraus (1861–1951), Dutch politician
 Jillian Kraus (born 1986), American water polo player
 Jody Kraus, American lawyer
 Joe Kraus, American businessman
 John D. Kraus (1910–2004), American electrical engineer
 Joseph Martin Kraus (1756–1792), German-Swedish classical composer
 Józef Antoni Kraus (died 1721), German sculptor
 Katja Kraus (born 1970), German footballer
 Karl Kraus (writer) (1874–1936), Austrian writer
 Kevin Kraus (born 1992), German footballer
 Lili Kraus (1903–1986), Hungarian pianist
 Marianne Kraus (1765–1838), German painter, drafter and writer
 Melanie Kraus (born 1974), German long-distance runner
 Michael Kraus (disambiguation)
 Milton Kraus (1866–1942), American politician
 Nadine Kraus (born 1988), German footballer
 Nicola Kraus (born 1974), American novelist
 Nina Kraus, American neuroscientist
 Ognjen Kraus (born 1945), Croatian physician and Jewish community leader 
 Oliver Kraus (born 1970), English musician
 Oskar Kraus (1872–1942), Czech philosopher
 Otakar Kraus (1909–1980), Czech (later British) baritone
 Otto Kraus (1930–2017), German zoologist
 Patricia Kraus (born 1964), Spanish singer
 Paul Kraus (born 1944), Holocaust survivor and author, considered the longest-lived mesothelioma survivor
 Paul Kraus (Arabist) (1904–1944), Arabist researcher
 Peter Kraus (born 1939), German singer
 Peter S. Kraus, American businessman
 Philip Kraus (born 1950), American operatic baritone and stage director
 Richard E. Kraus (1925–1944), United States Marine posthumously awarded the Medal of Honor
 Robert Kraus (1925–2001), American children's author, cartoonist, and publisher
 Sarit Kraus (born 1960), Israeli computer scientist
 Sharron Kraus, English singer, songwriter, and musician
 Shmulik Kraus (born in 1935–2013), Israeli actor and pop-rock singer and composer
 Sonya Kraus (born 1973), German television presenter
 Tadeusz Kraus (1932–2018), Czechoslovak-Polish footballer
 Tomáš Kraus (born 1974), Czech alpine skier and freestyle skier
 Ursula Kraus (1930–2021), German politician, mayor
 Viorel Kraus (born 1940), Romanian footballer
 Živa Kraus (born 1945), Croatian painter
 Will Kraus (born 1973), American politician
 Will Kraus, aka Kraus (shoegaze musician) (born 1994/95), American musician
 Wolfgang Kraus (born 1953), German football player
 Yael Kraus, Israeli singer-songwriter

Fictional characters
 Johann Kraus, in the Hellboy universe

See also
 Krausová, feminine form of the surname Kraus in Czech language
 Krause
 Krauss
 Krauze
 Krausz

German-language surnames
Jewish surnames
Surnames from nicknames